Arbuzynka Raion was a subdivision of Mykolaiv Oblast of Ukraine. Its administrative center was the urban-type settlement of Arbuzynka.  The raion was abolished on 18 July 2020 as part of the administrative reform of Ukraine, which reduced the number of raions of Mykolaiv Oblast to four. The area of Arbuzynka Raion was merged into Pervomaisk Raion. The last estimate of the raion population was

History
In the beginning of the 19th century, the current area of the district belonged to Yelisavetgradsky Uyezd of Kherson Governorate. In 1816, the areas of Konstantinovskaya and Blagodatnovskaya Volosts were made military settlements. In 1828, Yelisavetgradsky Uyezd was merged with Olviopolsky Uyezd into Bobrinetsky Uyezd. In 1857, military settlements were abolished. In 1865, the administrative center of Bobrinetsky Uyezd was moved to Yelisavetgrad, and the uyezd was renamed Yelisavetgradsky. On 16 April 1920, Kherson Governorate was renamed Nikolayev Governorate, and on 21 October 1922, it was merged into Odessa Governorate. In 1923, uyezds in Ukrainian Soviet Socialist Republic were abolished, and the governorates were divided into okruhas. In 1925, the governorates were abolished, and okruhas were directly subordinated to Ukrainian SSR. In 1930, okruhas were abolished, and in 1931, Arbuzynka Raion, with the administrative center in Harbuzynka, was established. On 27 February 1932, Odessa Oblast was established, and Arbuzynka Raion was included into Odessa Oblast. In 1944, Arbuzynka Raion was transferred to Mykolaiv Oblast. In 1946, Harbuzynka was renamed Arbuzynka. In January 1963, during the abortive Khrushchyov administrative reform, Arbuzynka Raion was abolished and split between Pervomaisk and Bratske Raions. In 1966, Arbuzynka Raion was re-established. In 1967, Arbuzynka was granted urban-type settlement status.

Subdivisions
At the time of disestablishment, the raion consisted of two hromadas, 
 Arbuzynka settlement hromada with the administration in Arbuzynka;
 Blahodatne rural hromada with the administration in the selo of Blahodatne.

References

Former raions of Mykolaiv Oblast
States and territories established in 1931
1931 establishments in the Soviet Union
States and territories disestablished in 1963
States and territories established in 1966
Ukrainian raions abolished during the 2020 administrative reform